Mischief is a 1931 British comedy film directed by Jack Raymond and starring Ralph Lynn, Winifred Shotter and Jeanne Stuart. It was shot at the Elstree Studios near London. It is based on the 1928 farce Mischief by Ben Travers.

Plot
When financier Reginald Bingham leaves on a business trip to Paris, normally devoted wife Eleanor leaves for a cottage with a secret boy friend. The couple are followed by friends of her husband, who attempt to hinder the affair. However, Reginald is also tempted by a fling with an old friend in Paris.

Cast
 Ralph Lynn as Arthur Gordon  
 Winifred Shotter as Diana Birkett 
 Jeanne Stuart as Eleanor Bingham  
 James Carew as Reginald Bingham  
 Jack Hobbs as Tom Birkett  
 Maud Gill as Louise Piper  
 Kenneth Kove as Bertie Pitts  
 Louie Emery as Mrs. Easy 
 A. Bromley Davenport 
 Andreas Malandrinos

Critical reception
TV Guide wrote, "This British farce is a nice combination of slapstick and verbal comedy...An above-average production for British features of this period."

References

Bibliography
 Low, Rachael. Filmmaking in 1930s Britain. George Allen & Unwin, 1985.
 Wood, Linda. British Films, 1927-1939. British Film Institute, 1986.

External links

1931 films
British comedy films
1931 comedy films
1930s English-language films
Films directed by Jack Raymond
British black-and-white films
British and Dominions Studios films
Films shot at Imperial Studios, Elstree
1930s British films
British films based on plays